Yuliya Rakovich  (born 1 August 1974) is a Belarusian freestyle skier. She was born in Minsk. She competed at the 1994 Winter Olympics, in women's aerials.

References

External links 
 

1974 births
Sportspeople from Minsk
Living people
Belarusian female freestyle skiers
Olympic freestyle skiers of Belarus
Freestyle skiers at the 1994 Winter Olympics